"I've Already Loved You in My Mind" is a song written and recorded by American country music artist Conway Twitty.  It was released in July 1977 as the first single and title track from the album I've Already Loved You in My Mind.  The song was Twitty's 20th number-one country hit in the United States.  The single stayed at number one for a single week and spent a total of 11 weeks on the country chart.

Charts

Weekly charts

Year-end charts

References

1977 singles
1977 songs
Conway Twitty songs
Songs written by Conway Twitty
Song recordings produced by Owen Bradley
MCA Records singles